Wu Guoqing (born 28 February 1995) is a Chinese cyclist. He competed at the 2020 Summer Paralympics in the men's time trial C4–5 and mixed team sprint C1–5, winning a silver medal in the latter alongside Li Zhangyu and Lai Shanzhang. They had also won the gold medal at the 2019 and 2020 UCI Para-cycling Track World Championships in the same category.

References

1995 births
Living people
Paralympic cyclists of China
Chinese male cyclists
Cyclists at the 2020 Summer Paralympics
Medalists at the 2020 Summer Paralympics
Paralympic silver medalists for China
21st-century Chinese people